To Beat the Band is a 1935 American romantic comedy directed by Benjamin Stoloff using a screenplay by Rian James based on a story by George Marion, Jr. The film stars Hugh Herbert, Helen Broderick, Roger Pryor, and Fred Keating, and features Johnny Mercer in a small role. Baritone Ronald Graham was a featured singer in the film.  It was released by RKO Radio Pictures on November 8, 1935.

References

1935 films
1935 musical comedy films
American musical comedy films
American black-and-white films
1930s romantic musical films
American romantic musical films
Films directed by Benjamin Stoloff
1930s English-language films
1930s American films